Portrait of an Unknown Gentleman or Man in a Black Beret Holding a Pair of Gloves is a 1530s oil on panel painting by the French artist Corneille de Lyon. It is now in the Museum of Fine Arts of Lyon, which bought it in 2014.

Sources
http://blogs.mediapart.fr/blog/horus/271015/corneille-de-lyon-entre-au-musee-des-beaux-arts

1530s paintings
Unknown
Unknown
French paintings
Paintings in the collection of the Museum of Fine Arts of Lyon